Postern Gap is a pass in the central ridge of Joinville Island, just east of Mount Tholus. Surveyed by the Falkland Islands Dependencies Survey (FIDS) in 1954. So named by the United Kingdom Antarctic Place-Names Committee (UK-APC) because this is the only way through the ridge which gives access to the central part of the south coast of Joinville Island.

Mountain passes of Graham Land
Landforms of the Joinville Island group